Quasi-phase-matching is a technique in nonlinear optics which allows a positive net flow of energy from the pump frequency to the signal and idler frequencies by creating a periodic structure in the nonlinear medium. Momentum is conserved, as is necessary for phase-matching, through an additional momentum contribution corresponding to the wavevector of the periodic structure. Consequently, in principle any three-wave mixing process that satisfies energy conservation can be phase-matched. For example, all the optical frequencies involved can be collinear, can have the same polarization, and travel through the medium in arbitrary directions. This allows one to use the largest nonlinear coefficient of the material in the nonlinear interaction.

Quasi-phase-matching ensures that there is positive energy flow from the pump frequency to signal and idler frequencies even though all the frequencies involved are not phase locked with each other.  Energy will always flow from pump to signal as long as the phase between the two optical waves is less than 180 degrees.  Beyond 180 degrees, energy flows back from the signal to the pump frequencies.  The coherence length is the length of the medium in which the phase of pump and the sum of idler and signal frequencies are 180 degrees from each other.  At each coherence length the crystal axes are flipped which allows the energy to continue to positively flow from the pump to the signal and idler frequencies.

The most commonly used technique for creating quasi-phase-matched crystals has been periodic poling.  More recently, continuous phase control over the local nonlinearity was achieved using nonlinear metasurfaces with homogeneous linear optical properties but spatially varying effective nonlinear polarizability. Optical fields are strongly confined within or surround the nanostructures, nonlinear interactions can therefore be realized with an ultra-small area down to 10 nm to 100 nm and can be scattered in all directions to produce more frequencies. Thus, relaxed phase matching can be achieved at the nanoscale dimension.

Mathematical description
In nonlinear optics, the generation of other frequencies is the result of the nonlinear polarization response of the crystal due to fundamental pump frequency.  When the crystal axis is flipped, the polarization wave is shifted by 180°, thus ensuring that there is a positive energy flow to the signal and idler beam.  In the case of sum-frequency generation, polarization equation can be expressed by

where  is the nonlinear susceptibility coefficient, in which the sign of the coefficient is flipped when the crystal axis is flipped, and  represents the imaginary unit.

Development of signal amplitude

The following mathematical description assumes a constant pump amplitude.  The signal wavelength can be expressed as a sum over the number of domains that exist in the crystal.  In general the rate of change of the signal amplitude is

The  refers to the nonlinear susceptibility of the crystal.

For the  domain  can be expressed as

where  is the index of the poled domain.  The total signal amplitude  can be expressed as a sum

where  is the spacing between poles in the crystal.  The above equation integrates to

and reduces to

The summation  yields

Multiply above equation both sides by a factor of 

Adding both equation leads to the relation

Solving for  gives

which leads to

The total intensity can be expressed by

For the case of  the right part of the above equation is undefined so the limit needs to be taken when  by invoking L'Hôpital's rule.

Which leads to the signal intensity

In order to allow different domain widths, i.e.

With  the intensity  becomes

This allows quasi-phase-matching to exist at different domain widths .
For example, for 3rd order quasi-phase matching only a third of the crystal is effectively used for the generation of signal frequency, as a consequence the amplitude of the signal wavelength only third of the amount of amplitude for same length crystal for 1st order quasi-phase match.

Calculation of domain width
The domain width is calculated through the use of Sellmeier equation and using wavevector relations. By calculating  for the different frequencies, the domain width can be calculated from the relationship .

Orthogonal quasi-phase-matching 
This method enables the generation of high-purity hyperentangled two-photon state. In orthogonal quasi-phase matching (OQPM), a thin-layered crystal structure is combined with periodic poling along orthogonal directions. By combining periodic down- conversion of orthogonally polarized photons along with periodic poling that corrects the phase mismatch, the structure self corrects for longitudinal walkoff (delay) as it happens and before it accumulates. The superimposed spontaneous parametric downconversion (SPDC) radiation of the superlattice creates high-purity two-photon entangled state.

References

Nonlinear optics
Second-harmonic generation